John Chrysostom Lan Shi (1925 – September 21, 2014) was a Catholic bishop.

Born in China, Lan Shi was ordained a priest  in 1954. On 2000, he was clandestinely consecrated coadjutor bishop of the Diocese of Sanyuan. From 2003 to 2008 was a bishop ordinary at the same diocese.

References

1925 births
2014 deaths
21st-century Roman Catholic bishops in China
Chinese Roman Catholic bishops